The 1994 NCAA Division I Men's Basketball Championship Game was the finals of the 1994 NCAA Division I men's basketball tournament and it determined the national champion for the 1993-94 NCAA Division I men's basketball season  The 1994 National Title Game was played on April 4, 1994 at the Charlotte Coliseum in Charlotte, North Carolina. The 1994 National Title Game was played between the 1994 Midwest Regional Champions, #1-seeded Arkansas and the 1994 Southeast Regional Champions, #2-seeded Duke.

Participating teams

Duke

East
Duke (2) 82, Texas Southern (15) 70
Duke 85, Michigan State (7) 74
Duke 59, Marquette (6) 49
Duke 69, Purdue (1) 60
Final Four
Duke 70, Florida (3) 65

Arkansas

Southeast
Arkansas (1) 94, North Carolina A&T (16) 79
Arkansas 85, Georgetown (9) 73
Arkansas 103, Tulsa (12) 84
Arkansas 76, Michigan (3) 68
Final Four
Arkansas 91, Arizona (2) 82

Starting lineups

Game summary

Duke's Grant Hill made a 3-pointer to tie the game at 70 with 1:30 left.  After an Arkansas timeout, Scotty Thurman hit a 3-pointer over Antonio Lang as the 35-second shot clock expired, giving the Razorbacks a 73-70 lead with 50.7 seconds remaining.  Chris Collins missed a 3 that would have tied the score.  Clint McDaniel rebounded for Arkansas and was fouled with 28.4 seconds left.  He made one of two free throws to put Arkansas up by four, 74-70.  Collins missed a floater in the lane.  Corey Beck rebounded and was fouled.  Beck missed the first free throw and made the second for a 75-70 Razorbacks lead with 17.2 seconds left.  Jeff Capel's 3-point attempt missed, but Cherokee Parks got the offensive rebound and scored on the putback to bring the Blue Devils within three, 75-72, with 10.2 seconds left.  McDaniel was fouled with 9 seconds left, and he hit one of two free throws to seal the national championship for Arkansas with a 76-72 victory over Duke.

References

NCAA Division I Men's Basketball Championship Game
NCAA Division I Men's Basketball Championship Games
Arkansas Razorbacks men's basketball
Duke Blue Devils men's basketball
College sports in North Carolina
NCAA Division I Basketball Championship Game, 1994
NCAA Division I Men's Basketball Championship Game
NCAA Division I Basketball Championship Game